Jose Davis (born July 29, 1978) is a former arena football quarterback. Davis attended Kent State University, where he played football.

High school years
Davis attended Bellaire High School in Bellaire, Ohio and was a student and a letterman in football, basketball and baseball. He was an All-State selection in both, football and basketball.

College
Davis attended Kent State University from 1996 to 1999 and was a three-year starter. He left the Kent State Golden Flashes holding every school career and single-game passing and total offense record in school history. He set a conference record in 1997 by throwing for 551 yards in a loss to Daunte Culpepper's Central Florida Knights. He also played with the Kent State men's basketball team during the 1997–98 season.

Personal
His brother, Nate, was the starting quarterback with the Ball State Cardinals from 2006 to 2008 and was drafted in the 2009 NFL Draft by the San Francisco 49ers.  In 2009, Jose Davis was named the coach at Bellaire High School, where he and Nate both played. He resigned after the 2013 season., but two months later agreed to become the head coach at Bellaire St. John HS.

References

External links
 Biography ArenaFootball.com

1978 births
Living people
American men's basketball players
American football quarterbacks
Basketball players from Ohio
Kent State Golden Flashes men's basketball players
Kent State Golden Flashes football players
American players of Canadian football
Canadian football quarterbacks
Winnipeg Blue Bombers players
Indiana Firebirds players
Colorado Crush players
Grand Rapids Rampage players
Kansas City Brigade players
Cleveland Gladiators players
People from Bellaire, Ohio
Players of American football from Ohio
Ohio Valley Greyhounds players